Six ships of the French Navy have borne the name Républicain ("Revolutionary"):
 , a 110-gun ship of the line, was renamed Républicain in 1792.
 , a 20-gun corvette (1793–1794)
 , a 10-gun lugger (1793–1796)
 , a fluyt (1795)
 , a 110-gun , was renamed Républicain in 1797.

Five ships of the French Navy have borne the name Républicaine ("Revolutionary"):
 Républicaine, a 4-gun felucca (1793–1799) 
 , a 24-gun  (1794–1799)
 Républicaine, a lugger (1794–1795)
 , an 18-gun corvette
 , an 18-gun fluyt
 , a 32-gun  (1794–1796)

Two ships of the French Navy have borne the name République française:
 , a 120-gun ship of the line
 République française (1795), a tartane

The frigate  was started as République italienne

See also 
 
 
 

French Navy ship names